George Wilkins (December 6, 1817 – March 22, 1902) was a Vermont attorney and politician who served as President of the Vermont State Senate.

Biography
Wilkins was born in Stowe, Vermont. He studied law, attained admission to the bar in 1841 and began a practice in Stowe.

Wilkins was also a successful businessman, with real estate holdings including more than 40 farms throughout Lamoille County.  He was also a founder and member of the board of directors of the Lamoille County National Bank.

A Republican, Wilkins served as Lamoille County State's Attorney from 1852 to 1853.

In 1859 he was elected to one term in the Vermont Senate, and he served as President Pro Tem from 1860 to 1861.

Wilkins was a Delegate to the Republican National Conventions in 1864 and 1872.  In 1868 he was a Republican Presidential Elector, and cast his ballot for Ulysses S. Grant.

Despite his advanced age, Wilkins was still maintaining an active law practice when he died in Stowe.

References

1817 births
1902 deaths
People from Stowe, Vermont
Vermont lawyers
State's attorneys in Vermont
Republican Party Vermont state senators
Presidents pro tempore of the Vermont Senate
19th-century American politicians